At least two ships of the Argentine Navy have been named Paraná:

 , a steam corvette which served as a gunboat commissioned in 1874. She was renamed Piedrabuena in 1900 and re-rated as a transport. She was wrecked in 1926.
 , a  launched in 1908 and decommissioned in 1951.

Argentine Navy ship names